Inge Bödding, née Eckhoff (born 29 March 1947 in Hamburg) is a retired German athlete who competed mainly in the 400 metres.

She competed for West Germany at the 1972 Summer Olympics held in Munich where she won the bronze medal in the women's 4 x 400 metres with her teammates Anette Rückes, Hildegard Falck and Rita Wilden.

References

1947 births
Living people
West German female sprinters
Athletes (track and field) at the 1972 Summer Olympics
Olympic athletes of West Germany
Olympic bronze medalists for West Germany
Athletes from Hamburg
European Athletics Championships medalists
Medalists at the 1972 Summer Olympics
Olympic bronze medalists in athletics (track and field)
Olympic female sprinters